Karim Baïteche (born July 10, 1991) is an Algerian footballer who plays as a midfielder for RC Kouba in the Algerian Ligue 2.

Club

Honours

Club
 USM Alger
 Algerian Ligue Professionnelle 1 (2): 2013-14, 2015-16
 Algerian Cup (1): 2013
 Algerian Super Cup (1): 2013
 UAFA Club Cup (1): 2013

References

External links
 

Living people
1991 births
Algerian footballers
Algerian Ligue Professionnelle 1 players
CS Constantine players
USM Alger players
Footballers from Algiers
Association football midfielders
JS Kabylie players
USM El Harrach players
21st-century Algerian people